Manassoru Mayil is a 1977 Indian Malayalam film, directed by P. Chandrakumar. The film stars Vincent, Jayabharathi, Pattom Sadan, Sankaradi and Raghavan, Jayan in the lead roles. The film has musical score by A. T. Ummer.

Cast
Vincent
Raghavan
Jayan
Jayabharathi
Pattom Sadan
Sankaradi
Praveena
Kuthiravattam Pappu

Soundtrack
The music was composed by A. T. Ummer and the lyrics were written by Dr. Balakrishnan and Sathyan Anthikkad.

References

External links
 

1977 films
1970s Malayalam-language films
Films directed by P. Chandrakumar